Sweet is a basic taste sensation associated with sugars.

Sweet may also refer to:

Food
 Candy or sweets
 Confectionery or sweet
 Dessert or sweet
 Sweet (wine), a sweetness classification

Music
 The Sweet, a 1970s British glam rock band
 The Sweet (album) (1973)
 Sweet (Chara album) (1991)
 Sweet (Ken Mellons album) (2004)
 "Sweet", a song by Annie from Don't Stop
 "Sweet", a song by Common from The Dreamer/The Believer

People
 Sweet (surname)
 Sweet Charles Sherrell (born 1943), American bassist
 Chun Jung-Hee or Sweet (born 1983), former Warcraft III player

Places
 Sweet River, Jamaica
 Sweet, Idaho, United States, an unincorporated community

Other uses
 Sweet (company), a United States travel company
 Sweet (film), a 2000 short film by James Pilkington starring Noel Fielding and Julian Barratt
 Swedish ethyl acetate method, a method of chemical analysis
 Sweet crude oil, petroleum with less than 0.42% sulfur
 Sweet, a minor character in Buffy the Vampire Slayer
 Sean "Sweet" Johnson, a character in Grand Theft Auto: San Andreas
 SWEET transporters, a family of sugar transporters found in plants, animals, protozoans, and bacteria

See also
 Sweets (disambiguation)
 Swete, a surname
 Swetes, Antigua, Antigua and Barbuda; also called "Sweet's"
 Suite (disambiguation)